Candalides pruina is a species of butterfly of the family Lycaenidae. It was described by Druce in 1904. It is found from West Irian to Papua New Guinea.

References

Candalidini
Butterflies described in 1904